UFF or Uff may refer to:
 Uff!, a Venezuelan boy band
 Uganda Freedom Fighters, an anti-government faction in the Ugandan Bush War
 Ulster Freedom Fighters, paramilitary wing of the Ulster Defence Association, a loyalist organisation in Northern Ireland
 United Freedom Front, an American left-wing terrorist group active in the 1970s and 1980s
 Universal File Format, a file format used in computer aided test software packages
 Universal force field, an all atom potential containing parameters for every atom
 Universidade Federal Fluminense (Fluminense Federal University), a university in Brazil
 Uzbekistan Football Federation, the governing body of association football in Uzbekistan
 Team UFF, a Brazilian cycling team
 UltraFast Fibre, a local fibre company in New Zealand, part of the Ultra-Fast Broadband initiative
 Ulandshjælp fra Folk til Folk, projects organised by the Danish organisation Tvind

See also
 Uffie (born 1987), American musician